Kagnout (also called Cagnout or Cagnut) is a village in Casamance, Senegal. It is located near the left bank of the estuary of the Casamance River. It is part of the rural community of Mlomp, in the district of Loudia Ouoloff, the department of Oussouye and the region of Ziguinchor. Administratively, it is made up of three official villages: Cagnoute Bouhibane, Cagnoute Ebrouaye and Cagnoute Houyoho.

History 
On March 25, 1851, the leaders of Kagnout permanently ceded the island of Carabane to France.

Administration 
The village is part of the rural community of Mlomp in Oussouye, Ziguinchor.

Geography 
The nearest towns are Carabane, Hitou, Kabounkoute, Niomoune, Loudia Diola, Mlomp, and Samatit.

Bibliography

References

External links 
Maps, weather and airports for Kagnout

Populated places in Ziguinchor Region